Acourtia microcephala is a species of flowering plant in the family Asteraceae known by the common name sacapellote. It is native to southern California and Baja California, where it grows in woodland and chaparral, especially in the coastal mountain ranges.

Acourtia microcephala is a bushy perennial herb producing several erect stems from a woody caudex up to about 1.5 meters in maximum height. The stems branch toward the ends and are densely foliated in toothed, wavy-edged, glandular leaves 2 to 15 centimeters long. The stems and leaves are sticky with exudate. The inflorescences contain clusters of many flower heads, each cylindrical head wrapped in long, flat glandular phyllaries. The flower heads are discoid, containing only disc florets and no ray florets. Each disc floret has two lips, the outer of which is long, flat, and usually bright pink, and easily mistaken for a ligule. The fruit is a glandular achene a few millimeters long which has a pappus of bristles up to a centimeter in length.

This plant had a traditional medicinal use as a laxative.

References

External links
Jepson Manual Treatment
United States Department of Agriculture Plants Profile
Calphotos Photo gallery, University of California

Nassauvieae
Flora of Baja California
Plants described in 1838
Medicinal plants of North America
Flora of California
Flora without expected TNC conservation status